The Kodak DX7590 is a now-discontinued point and shoot model of digital camera first introduced in November 2004, replacing the earlier DX6490.  It was manufactured by Eastman Kodak as part of the Kodak EasyShare product line's DX series.

References 
 Digital Photography Review. (2004)
 Kodak.com

DX7590
Cameras introduced in 2004
Point-and-shoot cameras